The Conroy Virtus was a proposed American large transport aircraft intended to carry the Space Shuttle. Designed, beginning in 1974, by John M. Conroy of the Turbo-Three Corporation, it was to incorporate a pair of Boeing B-52 Stratofortress fuselages to form a new craft using existing parts for cost-savings. While the project was seriously considered, it proved impractically large and NASA chose to develop the Boeing 747–based Shuttle Carrier from surplus commercial aircraft instead.

History
The Space Shuttle was originally designed to use on-board turbofan engines for propulsion within the atmosphere on re-entry and for ferry flights between landing sites, such as Edwards Air Force Base, the White Sands Missile Range or contingency landing sites such as Easter Island, to the launch site at Kennedy Space Center at Cape Canaveral. When the air-breathing engines were deleted from the Shuttle design due to cost and weight concerns, a requirement arose for a transport aircraft capable of carrying the Shuttle from landing sites back to the Kennedy Space Center. One early design for a shuttle carrier aircraft was proposed by John M. Conroy, developer of the Pregnant Guppy and Super Guppy oversized cargo aircraft, in cooperation with the NASA Langley Research Center; named Virtus, a contract was issued for design and development work in 1974.

Expected to cost US$12.5 million each (equivalent to $ million in ), Virtus was a twin-fuselage design powered by four large jet engines; it was intended for these to be Pratt & Whitney JT9D turbofans. Conroy proposed extensive use of 'off the shelf' military parts in the design to reduce costs; this included the use of fuselages from Boeing B-52 Stratofortress strategic bombers to form the aircraft's main fuselage pods, added to a new wing and tail section. The Space Shuttle Orbiter would be carried under the center section of the Virtus aircraft's wing, between the fuselages; other large cargoes, including the Space Shuttle external tank, the Space Shuttle Solid Rocket Boosters, or dedicated cargo pods, could be alternatively carried.

The Virtus design was tested in the NASA Langley wind tunnel; while the results of the wind tunnel tests were considered promising, the drawbacks of such a large design, including the cost of developing an entirely new aircraft, flight testing the design and the sheer size of the aircraft requiring the development and/or expansion of infrastructure to support it, militated against further development of Virtus. The Lockheed Corporation, which had proposed a twin-fuselage version of its C-5 Galaxy airlifter to carry the Shuttle, also saw its proposal rejected for the same reasons. A more modest conversion of existing C-5s was proposed and nearly taken up by NASA but it was determined that having aircraft continually available was preferable to being restricted by the United States Air Force on the use of C-5s and a proposal by Boeing for a conversion of the 747 airliner was selected, becoming the Shuttle Carrier Aircraft. A proposed commercial version of the Virtus design, named Colossus, also failed to gain any further interest, and the Virtus design was abandoned.

Specifications

See also

References

Bibliography

External links
 

Virtus
Quadjets
Twin-fuselage aircraft
High-wing aircraft
NASA aircraft
Abandoned civil aircraft projects of the United States
Space Shuttle program
Aircraft related to spaceflight